FLP may refer to:

Computer science
 FLP impossibility proof in computer science

Organizations
 Family Limited Partnership, holding companies
 Forever Living Products, a US MLM company

Politics
 Farmer–Labor Party, a former US party
 Fatherland Party (Norway), a former party (Norwegian: Fedrelandspartiet)
 Fiji Labour Party
 Finnish Rural Party, a former party (Swedish: Finlands landsbygdsparti)
 Le front de libération populaire, a former party in Quebec, Canada
 Popular Liberation Front (Spain), a former party (Spanish: Frente de Liberación Popular)

Science
 Flurbiprofen
 Frustrated Lewis pair

Transportation
 Lugano–Ponte Tresa railway (Italian: Ferrovia Lugano–Ponte Tresa)
 Marion County Regional Airport, in Arkansas, United States
 Satish Dhawan Space Centre First Launch Pad, in India

See also
 Windows Fundamentals for Legacy PCs (WinFLP)